Stepping Fast is a 1923 American silent Western film directed by Joseph Franz and starring Tom Mix, Claire Adams and Donald MacDonald.

Cast
 Tom Mix as Grant Malvern 
 Claire Adams as Helen Durant 
 Donald MacDonald as Fabian 
 Hector V. Sarno as Martinez 
 Edward Peil Sr. as Sun Yat
 George Siegmann as 'Red' Pollock 
 Tom Guise as Quentin Durant 
 Edward Jobson as Commodore Simpson 
 Ethel Wales as Miss Higgins 
 Minna Redman as Mrs. Malvern

References

Bibliography
 Munden, Kenneth White. The American Film Institute Catalog of Motion Pictures Produced in the United States, Part 1. University of California Press, 1997.

External links
 

1923 films
1923 Western (genre) films
Films directed by Joseph Franz
American black-and-white films
Fox Film films
Silent American Western (genre) films
1920s English-language films
1920s American films